Camille Oscar Van Brabant (September 28, 1926 – August 18, 2018) was a Canadian professional baseball player. A right-handed pitcher, he appeared in 11 Major League Baseball games — nine for the 1954 Philadelphia Athletics (the club's final year in Philadelphia) and two for the 1955 Kansas City Athletics (its maiden season in Kansas City). He was born in Kingsville, Ontario.

Van Brabant's pro career lasted for four seasons. He broke into the minor leagues at age 25 with the 1952 Lincoln A's, winning 14 games, and then captured 16 of 31 decisions the following season with the Williamsport A's.  He split  between the Triple-A Ottawa Athletics and the parent team in Philadelphia.  Van Brabant lost his only two big-league starting assignments, both times to the Boston Red Sox, who defeated him 9–0 on May 31, 1954, and 4–3 on September 21.  The two defeats represented his only two decisions in the Major Leagues. As a big leaguer, Van Brabant gave up 39 hits and 20 bases on balls in 28 innings of work, with 11 strikeouts.  He retired after the 1955 season.

Van Brabant died on August 18, 2018, at the age of 91.

References

External links

1926 births
2018 deaths
Baseball people from Ontario
Canadian expatriate baseball players in the United States
Columbus Jets players
Kansas City Athletics players
Lincoln A's players
Major League Baseball pitchers
Major League Baseball players from Canada
Ottawa A's players
People from Essex County, Ontario
Philadelphia Athletics players
Williamsport A's players